Ronald Savariau (born 7 December 1943) is a Jamaican cricketer. He played in two first-class matches for the Jamaican cricket team in 1976/77.

See also
 List of Jamaican representative cricketers

References

External links
 

1943 births
Living people
Jamaican cricketers
Jamaica cricketers
Sportspeople from Kingston, Jamaica